In the Nuclear Shadow: What Can the Children Tell Us? is a 1983 American short documentary film directed by Eric Thiermann. It was nominated for an Academy Award for Best Documentary Short. The film includes interviews with youths discussing the nuclear threat, a first-hand account of the atomic destruction of Hiroshima, and excerpts of speeches by psychiatrists John E. Mack and Robert Jay Lifton.

References

External links

 In the Nuclear Shadow: What Can the Children Tell Us? at WorldCat

1983 films
1983 documentary films
American short documentary films
1980s short documentary films
Documentary films about nuclear war and weapons
1980s English-language films
1980s American films